Astroblepus frenatus is a species of catfish of the family Astroblepidae. It can be found in the Magdalena, Orinoco and Catatumbo river basins  in Colombia. A. frenatus is a carnivorous speciesand it is a habitat specialist which has a requirement for highly oxygenated water. This means that it is sensitive to changes in oxygenation levels and water temperatures. It may also be affected by the introduced rainbow trout (Oncorhynchus mykiss) but overall there is very little data about the status of this species.

References

Bibliography
Eschmeyer, William N., ed. 1998. Catalog of Fishes. Special Publication of the Center for Biodiversity Research and Information, num. 1, vol. 1–3. California Academy of Sciences. San Francisco, California, United States. 2905. .

Astroblepus
Endemic fauna of Colombia
Fish of South America
Freshwater fish of Colombia
Magdalena River
Fish described in 1918